Biser Point (‘Nos Biser’ \'nos 'bi-ser\) is the narrow rocky point next north of the terminus of Rusalka Glacier and forming the east side of the entrance to Dimitrov Cove on the northwest coast of Velingrad Peninsula on Graham Coast in Graham Land, Antarctica.

The point is named after the settlement of Biser in Southern Bulgaria.

Location

Maps
 British Antarctic Territory.  Scale 1:200000 topographic map. DOS 610 Series, Sheet W 65 64.  Directorate of Overseas Surveys, Tolworth, UK, 1971.
Antarctic Digital Database (ADD). Scale 1:250000 topographic map of Antarctica. Scientific Committee on Antarctic Research (SCAR). Since 1993, regularly upgraded and updated.

References
 Biser Point. SCAR Composite Antarctic Gazetteer
 Bulgarian Antarctic Gazetteer. Antarctic Place-names Commission. (details in Bulgarian, basic data in English)

External links
 Biser Point. Copernix satellite image

Headlands of Graham Land
Bulgaria and the Antarctic
Graham Coast